Roger I. de Sentes also known as Rogerius  was an twelfth century French Catholic Bishop.

Not much is known of his career or episciple work but he was Bishop of Oloron from 1102 until 1114 A.D. His most notable achievement is the construction of Oloron Cathedral.

References

Bishops of Oloron
12th-century French Roman Catholic bishops